Eupithecia psiadiata is a moth in the family Geometridae. It is found in Kenya.

The larvae feed on Psiadia arabica.

References

Endemic moths of Kenya
Moths described in 1952
psiadiata
Moths of Africa